S. Udeiappan Palani Alagan Digambaran (born 10 January 1967) is a Sri Lankan politician and government minister. He is the leader of the National Union of Workers (NUW), a member of the Tamil Progressive Alliance (TPA) and United National Front for Good Governance (UNFGG).

Early life
Digambaran was born on 10 January 1967.

Career
Digambaran runs a textile business and is leader of the National Union of Workers (NUW).

Digambaran contested the 2004 provincial council election as one of the Up-Country People's Front's candidates in Nuwara Eliya District and was elected to the Central Provincial Council. He was re-elected at the 2009 provincial council election, this times as a United National Front (UNF) candidate.

Digambaran contested the 2010 parliamentary election as one of the UNF candidates in Nuwara Eliya District and was elected to Parliament. The NUW left the UNF alliance on 22 April 2010 after a dispute over National List seats. Digambaran continued to be part of the opposition as an independent MP. In August 2013 Digambaran and two others were charged with attempting to acquire 12 perches of land and a vehicle by force from their lawful owner but the case was dropped after the defendants offered to compensate the victim for the vehicle.

Digambaran was appointed Deputy Minister of National Languages and Social Integration on 21 August 2014. He resigned from the UPFA government on 10 December 2014 to support common opposition candidate Maithripala Sirisena at the presidential election. After the election newly elected President Sirisena rewarded Digambaran by appointing him Minister of Plantation Infrastructure Development.

Digambaran was one of the United National Front for Good Governance's candidates in Nuwara Eliya District at the 2015 parliamentary election. He was elected and re-entered Parliament. He was sworn in as Minister of Hill Country, New Villages, Infrastructure and Community Development on 4 September 2015.

Electoral history

References

1967 births
Cabinet ministers of Sri Lanka
Deputy ministers of Sri Lanka
Living people
Indian Tamil businesspeople of Sri Lanka
Indian Tamil politicians of Sri Lanka
Members of the 14th Parliament of Sri Lanka
Members of the 15th Parliament of Sri Lanka
Members of the 16th Parliament of Sri Lanka
Members of the Central Provincial Council
People from Central Province, Sri Lanka
Sri Lankan Hindus
Samagi Jana Balawegaya politicians
United People's Freedom Alliance politicians
Up-Country People's Front politicians